Viktor Iaremchuk (born January 13, 1991) is a Ukrainian male acrobatic gymnast. With partners Oleksandr Nelep, Oleksii Lesyk and Andrii Kozynko, Iaremchuk achieved 5th in the 2014 Acrobatic Gymnastics World Championships.

References

External links
 

1991 births
Living people
Ukrainian acrobatic gymnasts
Male acrobatic gymnasts